Bessines-sur-Gartempe (literally Bessines on Gartempe; Limousin: Becinas) is a commune in the Haute-Vienne department in the Nouvelle-Aquitaine region in western France.

Geography
The river Semme forms part of the commune's north-eastern border, flows westward through the northern part of the commune, north of Morterolles-sur-Semmes, a hamlet, then forms part of the commune's north-western border.

The river Gartempe forms part of the commune's eastern border, flows westward through the middle of the commune, north of Bessines-sur-Gartempe, the main village, then forms part of the commune's western border.

Inhabitants are known as Bessinauds.

Culture
In the late 20th century, the community's local band, a traveling chamber orchestra known as "La Banda de Bessines" ("The Bessines Band"), gained some national repute, winning French National Band Championships in 1988, 1989, 1991, 1992, 1995, 1996, and 2005.

Bessines sur Gartempe has also been awarded the prestigious "Village d'Etape" status.

People
The painter Suzanne Valadon was born in the village in 1865.

Gallery

See also
Communes of the Haute-Vienne department

References

External links

Communes of Haute-Vienne